George C. Rable is an American historian and author. He is Professor Emeritus at the University of Alabama.  He received the Lincoln Prize in 2003 for his 2002 book Fredericksburg! Fredericksburg!

Education
He received a bachelor of arts degree from Bluffton College in 1972 and a Master of arts degree from Louisiana State University in 1973. He received his doctoral degree from Louisiana State University in 1978.

Career
He is a past president of the Society of Civil War Historians. At the University of Alabama has received the Burnum Distinguished Faculty Award and the Blackmon-Moody Award.

His 2002 book Fredericksburg! Fredericksburg! received the 2003 Lincoln Prize, a $50,000 award for excellence in Civil War scholarship. The book includes a traditional military analysis of the Civil War while also exploring the social context of the conflict. The book was also awarded the Jefferson Davis Award and the Douglas Southall Freeman Award and the Society for Military History's Distinguished Book Award in American Military History.

His book God's Almost Chosen Peoples:  A Religious History of the American Civil War (2010) won the Jefferson Davis Award and was a Choice Outstanding Academic Title.

Publications 
But There Was No Peace: The Role of Violence in the Politics of Reconstruction  Athens:  University of Georgia Press, 1984.Civil Wars: Women and the Crisis of Southern Nationalism. Urbana: University of Illinois Press, 1989.  A Revolution against Politics: The Confederate States of America. Chapel Hill: University of North Carolina Press, 1994.  News from Fredericksburg. Milwaukee: Marquette University Press, 2000.  Fredericksburg! Fredericksburg! Chapel Hill: University of North Carolina Press, 2002.  God's Almost Chosen Peoples: A Religious History of the American Civil War. Chapel Hill: University of North Carolina Press, 2010.  Damn Yankees!: Demonization & Defiance in the Confederate South''. Baton Rouge: Louisiana State University Press, 2015.

References 

Living people
Lincoln Prize winners
University of Alabama faculty
21st-century American historians
21st-century American male writers
American military historians
Historians of the American Civil War
Year of birth missing (living people)
American male non-fiction writers